Björn-Olof Alholm (25 April 1925 Mikkeli - 17 June 2011 Helsinki) was a Finnish ambassador who made a 40-year career in Foreign Affairs and was a known as  dissident during the Urho Kekkonen presidency

Alholm fought in the Winter War at the age of 14 in a division led by his father's Jaeger Lieutenant Colonel Georg Alholm. He wounded in 1941 but was still involved in a major battle at Kannas in 1944.

In the autumn of 1944, Alholm entered t the Reserve Officer School. Alholm graduated as a Master of Political Science in 1948 and joined to the Ministry for Foreign Affairs the same year. As an ambassador he started in 1966 in Bucharest and then in Switzerland between 1968-1970 and then in Moscow between 1970 and 1974 and then in 1974–1977 in Bonn.

Alholm's Bonn time was stormy, and, among other things, these times and, more generally, Kekkonen presidency he has dealt with in his book The Dissident Ambassador (2001). After Bonn, Alholm worked in Cairo, Vienna and last since 1983 in Stockholm, he retired in 1991

References 

Finnish soldiers
Ambassadors of Finland to Romania
Ambassadors of Finland to the Soviet Union
Ambassadors of Finland to Sweden
Ambassadors of Finland to West Germany
Ambassadors of Finland to Austria
Ambassadors of Finland to Egypt
1925 births
2011 deaths
Permanent Representatives of Finland to the United Nations
Ambassadors of Finland to Switzerland
Officers Crosses of the Order of Merit of the Federal Republic of Germany